is a former village that was located in the Nakakoma District of Yamanashi Prefecture, Japan. The village was formed in 1875 from the merger of three villages; Enokihara (榎原村), Shimotakasago (下高砂村) and Tokunaga (徳永村). In 1956 it merged with the neighbouring village of Mikage to form the village of Hatta. On 1 April 2003, Hatta merged with five other municipalities of Nakakoma District to form the city of Yamanashi.

References

Dissolved municipalities of Yamanashi Prefecture